Harry Philbrick (born 1958 in Providence, Rhode Island, US) is the founding director of the nonprofit arts organization and future space for contemporary art, Philadelphia Contemporary.  From 2011 to 2016 he was Director of the Museum at the Pennsylvania Academy of the Fine Arts, and previously, Director of The Aldrich Contemporary Art Museum from 1996 to 2010.

At PAFA, Philbrick developed new school and community education programs and strengthened the presence of contemporary art within the historic museum’s collection and exhibition program. Philbrick started at The Aldrich Museum as Director of Education, developing the groundbreaking “Student Docent Program” that trained young people to lead tours for their peers. Under Philbrick’s directorship, the Aldrich expanded to increase exhibition space and create an education center and sculpture garden.

Curated or co-curated exhibitions including:

 Living With Contemporary Art (1996)
 The Nude in Contemporary Art (1999)
 Ann Hamilton: Whitecloth (1999)
 Faith: The Impact of Judeo-Christian Religion on Art at the Millennium (2000)
 Janine Antoni: The Girl Made of Butter (2001)
 Contemporary Erotic Drawing(2005)
 Anselm Kiefer: Velimir Chlebnikov and the Sea(2006)
 Voice & Void: Hall Curatorial Fellow Exhibition(2008)
 Dive Deep: Eric Fischl and the Process of Painting(2012)

References

External links
  ART/ARCHITECTURE; This Old Museum
 philadelphia contemporary profile

1958 births
Living people
People from Providence, Rhode Island
American art curators